Lamatorma was a town of ancient Cilicia, inhabited in Roman times. 

Its site is located near Damlaçalı, Asiatic Turkey.

References

Populated places in ancient Cilicia
Former populated places in Turkey
Roman towns and cities in Turkey
History of Karaman Province